Glypican-5 is a protein that in humans is encoded by the GPC5 gene.

Cell surface heparan sulfate proteoglycans are composed of a membrane-associated protein core substituted with a variable number of heparan sulfate chains. Members of the glypican-related integral membrane proteoglycan family (GRIPS) contain a core protein anchored to the cytoplasmic membrane via a glycosyl phosphatidylinositol linkage.  These proteins may play a role in the control of cell division and growth regulation.

See also
 Glypican

References

Further reading